The 2018 National Hurling League was the 87th season of the National Hurling League for county teams.

Wexford finished top of Division 1B in 2017 and were promoted to Division 1A for 2018. Galway finished second in Division 1B in 2017 and so missed out on promotion, even though they subsequently won the Division 1 league final.

Cavan re-entered the National Hurling League in Division 3B, having previously withdrawn. Lancashire also entered in Division 3B for the first time.

Eir Sport and TG4 provided live TV coverage of the league on Saturday nights and Sunday afternoons respectively. Highlights programmes – RTÉ2 broadcast League Sunday on Sunday evenings, TG4 broadcast GAA 2018 on Monday evenings.

Kilkenny were the winners, defeating Tipperary in the final on 8 April by 2–23 to 2-17.
It was an 18th League title for Kilkenny.	

As National Hurling League champions Kilkenny played the 2017 All-Ireland champions Galway in Australia on 11 November 2018 for the Wild Geese Trophy as part of the Sydney Irish Festival.

Format

League structure

Thirty five teams compete in the 2018 NHL – six teams in the top five divisions (Divisions 1A, 1B, 2A, 2B, 3A) and five teams in Division 3B. All thirty-two county teams from Ireland take part. London, Lancashire and Warwickshire complete the lineup.

Each team plays all the other teams in their division once, either home or away. Two points are awarded for a win, and one for a draw.

The Division 1 hurling quarter-finals and semi-finals will finish on the day the games are played avoiding the need for replays. If a quarter-final or semi-final is level after the initial seventy minutes, still level after two ten minute periods of extra time played each way, and still level after two further five minute periods of extra time, the outcome will be decided by a free-taking competition. This will prevent games from going to a replay and allow the league finals to be held on the scheduled date.

Tie-breaker
 If only two teams are level on league points, the team that won the head-to-head match is ranked ahead. If this game was a draw, score difference (total scored minus total conceded in all games) is used to rank the teams.
 If  three or more teams are level on league points, score difference is used to rank the teams.

Finals, promotions and relegations

Division 1A
 The top four teams qualify for the Division 1 quarter-finals
 The bottom two teams meet in a relegation play-off, with the losing team relegated to Division 1B
Division 1B
 The top team is promoted to Division 1A
 The top four teams qualify for the Division 1 quarter-finals
 The bottom two teams meet in a play-off, with the losing team relegated to Division 2A
Division 2A
 The top two teams meet in Division 2A final, with the winning team promoted to Division 1B
 The bottom team is relegated to Division 2B
Division 2B
 The top two teams meet in Division 2B final, with the winning team being promoted to Division 2A
 The bottom two teams meet in a play-off, with the losing team relegated to Division 3A
Division 3A
 The top two teams meet in Division 3A final, with the winning team promoted to Division 2B
Division 3B
 The top two teams meet in Division 3B final, with the winner promoted to Division 3A

Division 1A

Division 1 Format

The 12 teams in Division 1 are ranked into two groups - teams ranked one to six in Division 1A and teams ranked seven to twelve in Division 1B. Each team plays all the other teams in its group once. Two points are awarded for a win and one for a draw. The top four teams in both 1A and 1B advance to the league quarter-finals with the top team in 1A playing the fourth team in 1B, the second team in 1A playing the third in 1B, etc. Two semi-finals and a final follow.

Division 1A Table

Division 1A Rounds 1 to 5

Division 1A Round 1

Division 1A Round 2

Division 1A Round 3

Division 1A Round 4

Division 1A Round 5

Division 1B

Division 1B Table

Division 1B Rounds 1 to 5

Division 1B Round 1

Division 1B Round 2

Division 1B Round 3

Division 1B Round 4

Division 1B Round 5

Division 1 Knockout

Division 1 Quarter-Finals

The hurling quarter-finals finish on the day the games are played, avoiding the need for replays. If the score is level after the initial seventy minutes, still level after two ten minute periods of extra time played each way, and still level after a further two five minute periods of extra time, a free-taking competition is held. Each team nominates five players to take frees from their chosen position on a sixty five metre line selected by the referee and without defenders. The nominated players from each team take alternate turns. If the teams score an equal number of the five frees, the outcome of the match is decided by sudden death frees using the same nominated players in the same order.

The fixtures are 1st in Division 1A plays 4th in Division 1B, 2nd in Division 1A plays 3rd in Division 1B, etc. Home advantage is decided by whichever team has played fewer home games in their five league games, with a coin toss taking place if this number is the same for both teams.

Division 1 Semi-Finals

The hurling semi-finals finish on the day the games are played, avoiding the need for replays. If the score is level after the initial seventy minutes, still level after two ten minute periods of extra time played each way, and still level after a further two five minute periods of extra time, a free-taking competition is held. Each team nominates five players to take frees from their chosen position on a sixty five metre line selected by the referee and without defenders. The nominated players from each team take alternate turns. If the teams score an equal number of the five frees, the outcome of the match is decided by sudden death frees using the same nominated players in the same order.

Division 1 Final

Division 1A relegation play-off

The losing team is relegated and plays in next year's Division 1B.

Division 1B relegation play-off

The losing team is relegated and plays in next year's Division 2A.

Division 1 scoring statistics

Top scorers overall

Top scorers in a single game

Division 2A

Division 2A Table

Division 2A Rounds 1 to 5

Division 2A Round 1

Division 2A Round 2

Division 2A Round 3

Division 2A Round 4

Division 2A Round 5

Division 2A Final

Division 2A scoring statistics

Top scorers overall

Top scorers in a single game

Division 2B

Division 2B Table

Division 2B Rounds 1 to 5

Division 2B Round 1

Division 2B Round 2

Division 2B Round 3

Division 2B Round 4

Division 2B Round 5

Division 2B Final

Division 2B relegation play-off

The losing team is relegated and plays in next year's Division 3A.

Division 2B scoring statistics

Top scorers overall

Top scorers in a single game

Division 3A

Division 3A Table

Division 3A Rounds 1 to 5

Division 3A Round 1

Division 3A Round 2

Division 3A Round 3

Division 3A Round 4

Division 3A Round 5

Division 3A Final

Division 3A scoring statistics

Top scorers overall

Top scorers in a single game

Division 3B

Division 3B Table

Division 3B Rounds 1 to 5

Division 3B Round 1

Division 3B Round 2

Division 3B Round 3

Division 3B Round 4

Division 3B Round 5

Division 3B Final

Division 3B scoring statistics

Top scorers overall

Top scorers in a single game

References

External links
Full Fixtures and Results

 
National Hurling League seasons